Glencoe Township may refer to the following townships in the United States:

 Glencoe Township, Butler County, Kansas
 Glencoe Township, McLeod County, Minnesota